Sid & Aya: Not a Love Story is a 2018 Philippine romantic drama film directed by Irene Villamor and starring Anne Curtis and Dingdong Dantes.

Synopsis 
The story follows Sid (Dingdong Dantes) who suffers from insomnia and meets Aya (Anne Curtis) whom he hires to accompany him in his sleepless nights.

Cast 
 Anne Curtis as Aya
 Dingdong Dantes as Sid
 Gabby Eigenmann as Darren Syquia
 Pocholo Baretto as Jerry
 Bubbles Paraiso as Dani
 Josef Elizalde as Gabe
 Pio Balbuena
 Gab Lagman
 Joey Marquez
 Jobelle Salvador
 Johnny Revilla

References

External links
 
 Sid & Aya: Not a Love Story on iflix

Philippine romantic drama films
Viva Films films
2018 romantic drama films
Films directed by Irene Emma Villamor